Robert Courtney Davis (October 12, 1876 – September 2, 1944) was an officer in the United States Army who served as Adjutant General of the U.S. Army from 1922 to 1927.

Early life
Robert C. Davis was born in Lancaster, Pennsylvania on October 12, 1876. He attended Franklin & Marshall College before being appointed to the United States Military Academy in 1894. Davis graduated in 1898 and was commissioned as a Second Lieutenant in the 17th Infantry Regiment.

Spanish–American War
Davis took part in the Spanish–American War, and saw action in Cuba. He was involved in the Santiago campaign and took part in the battles of El Caney and San Juan. He received the Silver Star for heroism at El Caney, and was recommended for a brevet promotion to First Lieutenant.

Davis subsequently served in the Philippine–American War. In August 1899, he received a second Silver Star and promotion to brevet Captain for heroism while fighting Filipino insurgents. He remained in the Philippines until 1904, when he was assigned to West Point as a professor in the Department of Tactics.

Post–Spanish–American War
In 1906, Davis returned to Cuba with the 17th Infantry. In 1909 he was assigned as aide-de-camp to Thomas Henry Barry. When Barry was appointed as West Point's Superintendent in 1911, Davis was assigned as the adjutant on Barry's staff.

Davis served again with the 17th Infantry, and then served again in the Philippines as a member of the 8th Infantry Regiment. For most of 1915, Davis was detailed as Inspector of the Philippine Scouts, and received promotion to Major.

World War I

At the start of World War I Davis was assigned to the staff of the army's Adjutant General. In mid-1917 he went to France as Assistant to the Adjutant General of the American Expeditionary Forces. He later served as acting adjutant general and then adjutant general of the A.E.F., receiving a temporary promotion to brigadier general.

Post-World War I

Following World War I Davis was assigned to the staff of the Army's Adjutant General, and participated on a board which reviewed War Department staff activities and made recommendations for personnel reorganization and improvements to processes and procedures.

From 1922 to 1927, Davis served as Adjutant General of the Army, receiving promotion to major general. His most notable accomplishment in this position was the organization and execution of a plan to pay bonuses to veterans of World War I.

Post-military career
After retiring from the Army, Davis was President of Photomaton, Inc., a company which produced automatic camera photo booths. He was also Executive Director of the New York Chapter of the American Red Cross, and served as President of the West Point Association of Graduates.

Death and burial
Davis died in Elmsford, New York on September 2, 1944 after suffering a heart attack while golfing at the Knollwood Country Club. He and his wife Ruby Hale are buried at Arlington National Cemetery.

Awards
In addition to his two Silver Stars, Davis received the Army Distinguished Service Medal for his World War I service. The medal's citation states the following:

He also received numerous foreign awards, including: the Legion of Honor (Commander) (France); Order of the Bath (Companion) (Great Britain); Order of the Crown (Commander) (Belgium); Order of the Crown (Commander) (Italy); Order of Prince Danilo I (Grand Cross) (Montenegro); and Medal of La Solidaridad (Second Class) (Panama).

Family
In 1902, Davis married Ruby Caroline Hale (1879–1959). They had no children.

See also

 List of Adjutant Generals of the U.S. Army

References

External links
 Memorial, Robert C. Davis (1898) at West Point Association of Graduates
 Robert Courtney Davis at ArlingtonCemetery.net, an unofficial website
 Robert C. Davis at Military Times Hall of Valor
 

1876 births
1944 deaths
United States Military Academy alumni
American military personnel of the Spanish–American War
American military personnel of the Philippine–American War
United States Army generals of World War I
United States Army generals
Adjutants general of the United States Army
Recipients of the Silver Star
Recipients of the Distinguished Service Medal (US Army)
Commandeurs of the Légion d'honneur
Honorary Companions of the Order of the Bath
Commanders of the Order of the Crown (Belgium)
Burials at Arlington National Cemetery
Franklin & Marshall College alumni
Military personnel from Pennsylvania